The women's 400 metres event at the 2014 World Junior Championships in Athletics was held in Eugene, Oregon, USA, at Hayward Field on 23, 24 and 25 July.

Medalists

Records

Results

Final
25 July
Start time: 20:29  Temperature: 25 °C  Humidity: 41 %

Semifinals
24 July
First 2 in each heat (Q) and the next 2 fastest (q) advance to the Final

Summary

Details
First 2 in each heat (Q) and the next 2 fastest (q) advance to the Final

Semifinal 1
25 July
Start time: 19:03  Temperature: 23 °C  Humidity: 44%

Semifinal 2
25 July
Start time: 19:11  Temperature: 22 °C  Humidity: 46%

Semifinal 3
25 July
Start time: 19:17  Temperature: 22 °C  Humidity: 46%

Heats
23 July
First 4 in each heat (Q) and the next 4 fastest (q) advance to the Semi-Finals

Summary

Details
First 4 in each heat (Q) and the next 4 fastest (q) advance to the Semi-Finals

Heat 1
25 July
Start time: 11:34  Temperature: 16 °C  Humidity: 82%

Note:
IAAF Rule 163.3(a) - Lane infringement

Heat 2
25 July
Start time: 11:40  Temperature: 16 °C  Humidity: 88%

Note:
IAAF Rule 163.3(a) - Lane infringement

Heat 3
25 July
Start time: 11:47  Temperature: 16 °C  Humidity: 88%

Heat 4
25 July
Start time: 11:52  Temperature: 16 °C  Humidity: 88%

Note:
IAAF Rule 163.3(a) - Lane infringement

Heat 5
25 July
Start time: 11:57  Temperature: 16 °C  Humidity: 88%

Participation
According to an unofficial count, 35 athletes from 29 countries participated in the event.

References

External links
 400 metres schedule

400 metres
400 metres at the World Athletics U20 Championships
2014 in women's athletics